This is a list of animated feature films first released in 1985.

Highest-grossing animated films of the year

See also
 List of animated television series of 1985

References

 Feature films
1985
1985-related lists